Chahe is a town in Rudong County, Nantong, Jiangsu.

Villages
, it administers the following five residential neighborhoods and 22 villages:
Yingchun Community
Yanchuan Community
Zhenbei
Qiguo
Guba
Zhenxing Village
Tangqiao Village
Nanqiao Village
Jinhe Village
Jinqiao Village
Xingfa Village
Jinfa Village
Longfa Village
Xinghe Village
Yinhe Village
Xinba Village
Xinqiao Village
Zhenhe Village
Xingbei Village
Xingang Village
Gubei Village
Lugang Village
Qixiu Village
Badong Village
Sanlian Village
Longfeng Village
Yulin Village

References

Rudong County
Township-level divisions of Jiangsu